The women's 5000 metres event at the 2015 Asian Athletics Championships was held on the 4 of June.

Results

References

5000
5000 metres at the Asian Athletics Championships
2015 in women's athletics